Acropyga rubescens is an ant in the Formicinae subfamily.

References

External links

 at antwiki.org

Formicinae
Insects described in 1894